The Chicago White Sox is a U.S. professional baseball team based in Chicago, Illinois.  The White Sox are members of the American League Central Division in Major League Baseball.  In baseball, the head coach of a team is called the manager, or more formally, the field manager. The duties of the team manager include team strategy and leadership on and off the field. Since the inception of the team in 1901, it has employed 41 different managers. The team's current manager is Pedro Grifol. Grifol was hired on November 3, 2022.

Grifol replaced Tony La Russa, who was re-hired on October 29, 2020. La Russa's first managerial stint with the team lasted from 1979 to 1986.

The franchise's first manager was Hall of Famer Clark Griffith, who managed the team for two seasons and led them to the American League championship in their inaugural season. Fielder Jones, who managed the team from 1904 to 1908, led the team to its second American League championship and its first World Series championship (no World Series was played in 1901), defeating the White Sox's crosstown rivals, the Chicago Cubs, in the 1906 World Series. Pants Rowland and Kid Gleason managed the White Sox to American League championships in 1917 and 1919, respectively, with the White Sox winning the 1917 World Series but losing the 1919 World Series in the infamous Black Sox scandal. The White Sox did not win another American League championship until 1959, with Al López as their manager. The White Sox lost the 1959 World Series to the Los Angeles Dodgers. The White Sox next captured the American League pennant in 2005 and, with Ozzie Guillén as their manager, defeated the Houston Astros in the 2005 World Series.

The longest–tenured White Sox manager was Jimmy Dykes, who managed the team for 1,850 games from 1934 to 1946. The only other White Sox managers who have managed more than 1,000 games are Lopez with 1,495, Guillén with 1,135, and Tony La Russa with 1,035. Dykes' 899 wins and 940 losses also lead all White Sox managers. Jones' winning percentage of .592 is the highest of any White Sox manager. Five White Sox managers have served multiple terms managing the team. Nixey Callahan was the White Sox manager in 1903 and part of 1904, and then again from 1912 to 1914. Johnny Evers served two terms as manager, separated by a bout of appendicitis in 1924. Eddie Collins served as interim manager for 27 games in 1924 season while Evers was ill and then served as the full–time manager in 1925 and 1926. Lopez served three terms as manager: the first from 1957 to 1965; then for 11 games during the 1968 season, before being hospitalized with appendicitis; and then returning for another 53 games from the end of the 1968 season through the beginning of the 1969 season.  Les Moss served as interim manager for two games in 1968, replacing Eddie Stanky before being replaced by Lopez. After Lopez was hospitalized later that season, Moss took over as manager again for 34 games before Lopez returned. Hall of Famer Frank Chance was hired to manage the team for the 1924 but illness forced him to retire before managing any games. Eleven Hall of Famers have managed the White Sox: Griffith, Hugh Duffy, Collins, Evers, Ed Walsh, Ray Schalk, Ted Lyons, Lopez, Bob Lemon Larry Doby and Tony La Russa. Lopez and La Russa were elected as manager; the others were elected as players.

Key

Managers
Statistics current through 2022 season

Managers with multiple tenures
Statistics current through 2020 season

References
General

Specific

 
Managers
Chicago White Sox